The Extra Aircraft company was established in 1980 as Extra Flugzeugbau in Germany by Walter Extra, an aerobatic pilot, to design and develop his own aerobatic aircraft. The company is located at Dinslaken airfield in Hünxe, North Rhine-Westphalia, Germany. Worldwide production of aircraft is about three units per month with a six-month backlog.

Products

Aerobatic 
 Extra EA-200 aerobatic trainer
 Extra EA-230 "Laser" - wooden-winged aerobatic aircraft
 Extra EA-260
 Extra EA-300 two-seat aerobatic aircraft with composite fuselage over steel-frame construction
 Extra EA-330

Tourers 
 Extra EA-330-LT low-wing variant
 Extra EA-400
 Extra EA-500

References

External links 

 Company website

Aircraft manufacturers of Germany
German companies established in 1980
Companies based in North Rhine-Westphalia
1980 establishments in West Germany